The Gathering  is a television mini series directed by Bill Eagles, starring Peter Fonda, Peter Gallagher, and Jamie-Lynn Sigler.  This thriller was first shown October 13, 2007, on Lifetime Television.

Plot  
Dr. Michael Foster wakes up one night to find his wife, Ann, missing. He is left with these mysteries and confusing clues, including disturbing images of his daughter and Ann. In the attempt to put those clues together, he discovers his wife's involvement with an ancient group of witches in modern-day New York City. As Michael gets closer to finding his wife and uncovering the truth, he realizes that very powerful people are involved in the mystery. Now Michael must not trust anyone and hurry before they get to him first.

Cast  
 Peter Fonda as Thomas Carrier
 Peter Gallagher as Dr. Michael Forster
 Jamie-Lynn Sigler as Maggy Rue
 Jenna Boyd  as Elizabeth Foster
 Hannah Lochner as Sarah
 Kristin Lehman as Ann Foster

External links 
 

2000s American television miniseries
Lifetime (TV network) films
Witchcraft in television
Films directed by Bill Eagles